All prisoners have the basic rights needed to survive and sustain a reasonable way of life. Most rights are taken away ostensibly so the prison system can maintain order, discipline, and security. Any of the following rights, given to prisoners, can be taken away for that purpose:

Prisoner may refer to one of the following:
 A person incarcerated in a prison or jail or similar facility.
 Prisoner of war, a combatant or non-combatant in wartime, held by a belligerent power
 Political prisoner, someone held in prison for their ideology.
 A person forcibly detained against his will, such as a victim of kidnapping; such prisoners may be held hostage, or held to ransom, but not necessarily in a prison or similar facility.

The right to:

 not be punished cruelly or unusually
 due processes
 administrative appeals
 access the parole process (denied to those incarcerated in the Federal System)
 practice religion freely
 equal protection (Fourteenth Amendment)
 be notified of all charges against them
 receive a written statement explaining evidence used in reaching a disposition
 file a civil suit against another person
 medical treatment (both long and short term)
 treatment that is both adequate and appropriate
 a hearing upon being relocated to the mental health facility.
 personal property such as: cigarettes, stationery, a watch, cosmetics, and snack-food
 visitation
 privacy
 food that would sustain an average person adequately. 
 bathe (for sanitation and health reasons).

Many rights are taken away from prisoners often temporarily. For example, prison personnel are required to read and inspect all in-going or out-going mail, in order to prevent prisoners from obtaining contraband. The only time a prisoner has a full right to privacy is in conversations with their attorney.

Prison Litigation Reform Act 

In the United States, the Prison Litigation Reform Act, or PLRA, is a federal statute enacted in 1996 with the intent of limiting "frivolous lawsuits" by prisoners. Among its  provisions, the PLRA requires prisoners to exhaust all possibly executive means of reform before filing for litigation, restricts the normal procedure of having the losing defendant pay legal fees (thus making fewer lawyers willing to represent a prisoner), allows for the courts to dismiss cases as "frivolous" or "malicious", and requires prisoners to pay their court fees up front if they have three previous instances of a case having been dismissed as "frivolous."

See also
Human rights in the United States #Prison system
Decarceration in the United States
Prisoner abuse in the United States
Penal labor in the United States
Prison rape in the United States
Organ donation in the United States prison population

References

External links 
 http://www.law.cornell.edu 

Penal system in the United States
Human rights in the United States